Leondaus "Lee" Lacy (born April 10, 1948) is an American former professional baseball outfielder. He played sixteen seasons in Major League Baseball (MLB) for the Los Angeles Dodgers, Atlanta Braves, Pittsburgh Pirates, and Baltimore Orioles between 1972 and 1987.

Playing career
Lacy appeared in four World Series with the Dodgers (1974; 1977–1978) and the Pirates (1979).

On May 17, 1978, Lacy hit his third consecutive pinch-hit home run, setting a major league record, as the Dodgers beat the Pirates, 10–1. His previous home runs were on May 2 and 6. Lacy's record was matched in 1979 by Del Unser, who hit three consecutive pinch-hit homers on June 30, July 5 and July 10.

In 1985, Lacy was among a number of players caught up in the Pittsburgh drug trials scandal. The next year, he was given a 60-day suspension but was allowed to continue playing if he donated five percent of his base salary and performed 50 hours of drug-related community service.

On June 8, 1986, as a member of the Orioles, Lacy hit three home runs and had six RBI in an 18-9 win over the Yankees.

Career statistics

In 1523 games played, Lacy recorded a .286 batting average (1303-4549) with 650 runs, 207 doubles, 42 triples, 91 home runs, 458 RBI, 185 stolen bases, 372 walks, .339 on-base percentage, and .410 slugging percentage. His overall career fielding percentage was .975.

Personal life
Lacy is the father of Jennifer Lacy, a forward for the Women's National Basketball Association (WNBA).

See also
List of doping cases in sport

References

External links

1948 births
Living people
African-American baseball players
Albuquerque Dodgers players
Arizona Instructional League Dodgers players
Atlanta Braves players
Bakersfield Dodgers players
Baltimore Orioles players
Baseball players from Texas
El Paso Dodgers players
People from Longview, Texas
Los Angeles Dodgers Legend Bureau
Los Angeles Dodgers players
Major League Baseball left fielders
Major League Baseball right fielders
Major League Baseball second basemen
Major League Baseball players suspended for drug offenses
Naranjeros de Hermosillo players
American expatriate baseball players in Mexico
Navegantes del Magallanes players
American expatriate baseball players in Venezuela
Ogden Dodgers players
Pittsburgh Pirates players
West Palm Beach Tropics players
21st-century African-American people
20th-century African-American sportspeople